Estadio San Carlos de Apoquindo is a football stadium, in Las Condes in the metropolitan region of Santiago de Chile. It is used mostly for home matches  stadium of the Chilean top club CD Universidad Católica which also owns the stadium. The stadium was built in 1988 and currently holds 14,118 people.

At the club's beginning, all sports were on Santa Rosa de las Condes Stadium, which is a big sport centre that is going to be demolished and transported to San Carlos. The club president of the time Manuel Vélez Samaniego decided to open this sports complex.

By 1945, the club played as the home team at the Independencia Stadium which was demolished because of the financial problems of the club, and started to play at Unión Española Stadium, the Santa Laura. In 1980, the idea of a new stadium comes out, the stadium was opened on September 4, 1988, the football stadium was not the whole complex, the stadium had also rugby, athletics and some other sport fields.

The highest attendance for a football match at San Carlos de Apoquindo to date is 20,936, for a 0–0 tie between Universidad Católica and Cobreloa on November 1, 1992.

Concerts
The stadium has hosted concerts by famous artists, spanning many different genres.

Roxette: April 25, 1992, Join the Joyride! Tour
Pat Metheny: September 16, 1993, as can be heard on the album Secret Story (album)
Whitney Houston: April 14, 1994, The Bodyguard World Tour
Oasis: March 14, 1998, Be Here Now Tour
Luis Miguel: November 7&8, 1997, Romances Tour
Avril Lavigne: September 15, 2005, Bonez Tour
Pearl Jam: November 22 & 23, 2005.
Queen + Paul Rodgers: November 19, 2008.

Video clips & music
Part of Pearl Jam's "World Wide Suicide" clip was filmed in the dresser rooms of the stadium.

Roxette's hit "It Must Have Been Love" (Live In San Carlos de Apoquindo) was included in their Tourism album (1992). In the booklet it reads: Vocals: Marie Fredriksson / Backing vocals: 45.000 Chilean fans.

References

Club Deportivo Universidad Católica
S
Sports venues in Santiago
Multi-purpose stadiums in Chile
Sports venues completed in 1988
1988 establishments in Chile
World Rugby Sevens Series venues
Las Condes